Shorea ovata (called, along with some other species in the genus Shorea, dark red meranti) is a species of plant in the family Dipterocarpaceae. It is a tree found in Sumatra, Peninsular Malaysia, Borneo and the Philippines. It is threatened by habitat loss.

References

ovata
Trees of Sumatra
Trees of Peninsular Malaysia
Trees of Borneo
Trees of the Philippines
Endangered plants
Taxonomy articles created by Polbot